Arròs a banda (Valencian term for rice on the side, translated as Arroz a banda in Spanish) is a dish of rice cooked in fish stock, typical of the coastal area of Alicante (and, per extension, in most of the Valencian Community), Spain, and distinct from the paella of Valencia. It is popular up to  Garraf, Barcelona (Catalonia) and down to Murcia (Region of Murcia).

It originated with the fishermen of Alicante, who sold off their best fish and kept the leftovers for stock, used to cook the rice. It is usually served with alioli.

Technology 
Basically the recipe consists of cooking the rice in a cheap fish broth with many bones called whitebait that had little value in the market and constituted the livelihood of the poor fishermen who reserved the best pieces for sale. Little by little, it begins to be elaborated with seafood broths and the most select fish.

The first is that in this whitebait broth, with a sauce of garlic, ñora and fish heads, potatoes are cooked and, after cooking, they are served in a soup plate. This stew is called cauldron sailor, and is served accompanied by alioli or ajoaceite (separately or in a sauce boat). The second part is that with the rest of the "bottom" of fish to which the sofrito was added, we can also cook a paella rice without any other additive. That rice is eaten apart from the fish, arroz a banda, apart. It is an authentic recipe of fishermen, who managed in this way to get two dishes from a single preparation. The aioli or garlic-oil is a fundamental accompaniment in these dishes, and it provided the humble people of the sea with calories that they could not obtain in any other way.

A rice similar to this is the arròs del senyoret, which is also made with the fish broth but, unlike the arroz a banda, it contains peeled prawns, grouper or chopped squid. The name of the senyoret (of the gentleman) is due to the fact that all the chunks that it has are clean, they are eaten directly, they do not have to be peeled or cut. These two types of rice should not be confused.

On the other hand, the arròs del senyoret in the Region of Murcia is called arroz a banda and is also eaten directly without having to peel the chunks; and the arroz a banda described here, in this same community is called caldero, Cartagena cauldron or Mar Menor cauldron.

External links 

 Arroz a Banda recipe

References 

Spanish rice dishes